Granton Road railway station served the district of Trinity, Edinburgh, Scotland from 1879 to 1962 on the Leith Branch.

History 
The station opened on 1 August 1879 by the Caledonian Railway. It closed on 30 April 1962. The platforms survive and the trackbed became a footpath.

References

External links 

Disused railway stations in Edinburgh
Railway stations in Great Britain opened in 1879
Railway stations in Great Britain closed in 1962
Former Caledonian Railway stations
1879 establishments in Scotland
1962 disestablishments in Scotland
Granton, Edinburgh